The 2130 class was a class of diesel locomotives built by Clyde Engineering, Eagle Farm for Queensland Railways in 1974–1975.

History
The 2130 class were an evolution of the 2141 class. They differed by having a flatter roofline to give better clearance when operating under wires. They were financed by the developers of the Saraji coal mine.

Between 2005 and 2007, all were rebuilt as 2250 class locomotives.

References

Clyde Engineering locomotives
Co-Co locomotives
Diesel locomotives of Queensland
Queensland Rail locomotives
Railway locomotives introduced in 1974
Diesel-electric locomotives of Australia
3 ft 6 in gauge locomotives of Australia